Glass Ghost may refer to:
Glass Ghost (band), known for releasing Idol Omen in 2009
Glass Ghost (musician), guitarist for Astrovamps
Glass Ghost (company), a video game development company known for Tank Racer and Eagle One: Harrier Attack

See also 
The Glass Ghost, an EP by Phildel